Augustine Arhinful (born April 4, 1994) is a Ghanaian footballer.

Career
Born in Mankessim, Arhinful played early football at Jennack Professional Club between 2008 and 2010, Dunkwa United FC, Brighten Stars FC and Hasaacas II.

Arhinful signed his first professional contract with Sekondi Hasaacas F.C. appearing 15 times for the club in 2015–16 season.

At the end of his contract at Sekondi Hasaacas F.C. he got transferred to Brong Ahafo base team Bechem United F.C. on January 1, 2018.

On May 21, 2018, Arhinful was signed by Liberty Professionals F.C. and was handed number 32.

References

External links
 
 

1994 births
Living people
People from Central Region (Ghana)
Association football defenders
Ghanaian footballers
Liberty Professionals F.C. players
Bechem United FC players
Ghana Premier League players
Sekondi Hasaacas F.C. players